Secrets of a Soul is a 1926 silent German drama film directed by G. W. Pabst.

Plot
Martin Fellman, a learned professor, experiences nightmares that make him believe he is going insane. He fears that he is on the verge of murdering his wife, who loves him dearly. He hires Dr. Orth, a psychiatrist, to help him work out his psychoses.

Cast
 Werner Krauss as Martin Fellman
 Ruth Weyher as Seine Frau
 Ilka Grüning as Die Mutter
 Jack Trevor as Erich
 Pavel Pavlov as Dr. Orth (as Pawel Pawloff)
 Hertha von Walther as Fellmans 
 Renate Brausewetter as Dienstmädchen
 Colin Ross as Kriminalkommissar
 Lili Damita (uncredited)

Production
Secrets of a Soul'''s producer Hans Neumann was a firm believer in the theories of Sigmund Freud and tried to get Freud to participate in the making of the film. Freud did not respond, so he hired Karl Abraham, a close associate of Freud's, as an adviser on the project, to help Neumann make the most psychologically realistic film possible.

The film was shot between September and November 1925, and was released in Berlin on 24 March 1926.

Reception
From retrospective reviews, Tom Milne in the Monthly Film Bulletin stated the film is split into "roughly three unequal parts" commenting that the "first and best, combining psychological subtlety and stark dramatic effect in the manner that was to become Pabst's trademark, is the opening sequence" while calling the final sequence of the film a "truly hideous final sequence, a tacked-on happy ending." Milne concluded that the film sees Pabst "engaged on a trial run for the much more integrated approach to the unconscious and its aberrations which lowered in The Love of Jeanne Ney, Crisis and Pandora's Box."

Troy Howarth commented in his book Tome of Terror: Horror Films of the Silent Era'' that the film was "a reasonably compelling psychological thriller" and that "Krauss is too old for the part, which requires the viewer to believe that he's married to a childhood sweetheart easily 20 years younger than he is."

References

External links

1926 films
1926 drama films
German silent feature films
German black-and-white films
Films directed by G. W. Pabst
Films of the Weimar Republic
UFA GmbH films
German drama films
Silent drama films
1920s German films
1920s German-language films